The Hampshire pig is a domestic swine breed characterized by erect ears, a black body, and a white band around the middle, covering the front legs.

The American National Swine Registry notes this as the fourth "most-recorded breed" of pig raised as livestock in the United States, and probably the oldest American breed of hog. It is believed to have derived from English Breed, found in northern England and Scotland.  Importations of this hog breed to America were thought to have been made from Hampshire in England between 1827 and 1839.  Pigs remaining in this part of England developed later into the Wessex Saddleback. Residents of Hampshire are often colloquially referred to as "Hampshire Hogs", a name which goes back at least to the 1790s.

Hampshire hogs are noted for being well-muscled and rapid growers, and for exhibiting good carcass quality when used as  meat animals.  When used as breeding stock, the sows of this breed have been praised for their capacity as mothers, having "extra longevity in the sow". Hampshires are good-tempered; they do not grow as fast as many cross-breds, but they do grow faster than American Yorkshires.

References

External links
Statue of "Hampshire Hog" outside Hampshire County Council offices (a Wessex Saddleback).

Pig breeds originating in the United States